This is a list of the Norway national football team results from 1930 to 1959.

1930s

1930

1931

1932

1933

1934

1935

1936

1937

1938

1939

1940s

1945

1946

1947

1948

1949

1950s

1950

1951

1952

1953

1954

1955

Notes

References

External links
RSSSF
Reports for all matches of Norway national team

Norway national football team results